The Tattooed Stranger, originally titled Backtrail, is a 1950 American crime film noir directed by Edward Montagne and starring John Miles, Patricia Barry (billed as Patricia White), Walter Kinsella, Frank Tweddell.

Plot
Rookie police detective Tobin leads the investigation into a series of brutal murders, starting with that of an unidentified woman with a tattoo on her wrist. He seeks the help of botanist Dr. Mahan to identify blades of grass in the car in which the corpse was found, and is surprised to learn that Mahan is a woman.

Cast
 John Miles as Detective Tobin
 Patricia Barry as Dr. Mary Mahan
 Walter Kinsella as Lieutenant Corrigan
 Frank Tweddell as Captain Lundquist
 Rod McLennan as Captain Gavin
 Henry Lasko as Joe Canko
 Arthur L. Jarrett as Johnny Marseille
 Jim Boles as Fisher
 William Gibberson as Aberfoyle
 Jack Lord as Det. Deke Del Vecchio
This was Miles' final film appearance and one of the first film roles for Lord, the future star of Hawaii Five-O.

Production 
The film features many New York location shots, many showing areas and structures that no longer exist, including elevated railroads, the Bowery when it was a derelict district and the dockside sections near the lower Manhattan bridges. Tobin and Mahan visit Fort Tryon Park with the George Washington Bridge visible in the background. Their investigation also leads them to Saint Raymond's Cemetery (Bronx).

Reception
The New York Times wrote: "The thrills are few and far between in this manhunt but its authenticity is obvious."

References

External links
 
 
 
 

1950 films
1950s crime thriller films
American crime thriller films
American black-and-white films
American detective films
Film noir
RKO Pictures films
Films set in New York City
Films directed by Edward Montagne
1950s English-language films
1950s American films